Staraya Masra  ( in Russian) is a village in the Aktobe Region of western Kazakhstan, located at 50°07'N 56°5'E.

References

Populated places in Aktobe Region